During colonial rule, agencies were administrative sub-divisions of British India. The Hazara Tribal Agency was one of these.

Hazara 

The Hazara region was split into the following four parts:

 Kohistan Tribal Area
 Hazara Tribal Area
 Princely State of Amb
 Hazara Division (Abbottabad and Mansehra)

The northernmost part was the Kohistan Tribal Area, whilst the southernmost part was the Hazara Division. Hazara Tribal Agency was located between the Hazara Division and the Kohistan Tribal Area.

Location 

The Hazara Tribal Area, was located in the northwest of British India, it bordered the following areas.

 Kohistan Tribal Area (to the northwest)
 Gilgit Agency (to the North and North East)
 Hazara Division (to the south)
 Amb (to the south east)

The Hazara Division lay along the route to Kashmir and Punjab. The State of Amb formed an enclave within the southern part of the Hazara Tribal area (the North, West and Southern frontiers of the state were along the borders of the agency).

Agencies of British India